Bolesław Polnar (1952 – 10 February 2014) was a Polish graphic artist, painter and teacher from  Opole.
One of the most important designers of theater posters in Poland. His works are in many individual collections.

Works in collections of 
 Opole
 Muzeum śląska Opolskiego
 J. Kochanowski Theater Gallery
 Kraków
 Teatr Stary Museum
 Poster Gallery
 S. Wyspiańskiego Theater Gallery (Katowice)
 Muzeum Plakatu Polskiego (Polish Poster Museum) (Wilanów)
 Private collections (France, Germany, England, United States)
 Pigasus – Polish Poster Gallery (Berlin)

References

Art navigator

External links

1952 births
2014 deaths
Polish painters
Polish male painters
Polish poster artists
Contemporary painters